Samaria may refer to:

Places
Samaria, historical province in the region of Palestine
Samaria (ancient city), capital of the Kingdom of Israel, roughly 930–720 BC 
Samaria, Indiana, a small town in the United States
Samaria, Michigan, an unincorporated community in the United States
Samaria Gorge on the island of Crete
Samaria District, one of the six administrative districts of Mandatory Palestine during British rule
Judea and Samaria Area

People
Agnes Samaria, a Namibian runner
Samaria (Mitcham) Bailey, a woman in the American civil rights movement

Transport
RMS Samaria (1920), a Cunard ocean liner
Samaria, British Rail Class 40 diesel locomotive D228, built by English Electric

Film
Samaritan Girl (Korean: Samaria), a 2004 South Korean film
Intrigo: Samaria, a 2019 German-Swedish-American mystery film

Other uses
The Samaria series of books by Sharon Shinn
Samaria, other name for samarium(III) oxide, the sesquioxide of the chemical element samarium
Samaria (bryozoan), an extinct genus of bryozoans in the order Fenestrata
Samaria (reptile), an extinct genus of reptiles provisionally included in the family Procolophonidae
Samaria (moth), a genus of moths in the family Pyralidae

See also
 Samara (disambiguation)
 Samar (disambiguation)